This is a partial list of breweries in Pennsylvania. In 2017 there are 300 licensed craft breweries in Pennsylvania. Only the notable ones are listed here.  One of these breweries is America's longest established, D.G. Yuengling & Son.  Yuengling is also the largest craft brewery in the country based on volume of sales. Other nationally known brands that are made in Pennsylvania include Dock Street Brewing Co.'s Bohemian Pilsner, first brewed in 1986, Victory Brewing Company's Hop Devil and Weyerbacher's Merry Monks.  Some of these breweries also feature a restaurant or snack bar at their breweries. Brewpubs in Pennsylvania do not distribute their products beyond the premises.

Breweries
The breweries listed here distribute their products beyond their own premises, unless they are designated as brewpubs:

Southeastern Pennsylvania
 Attic Brewing Company, Philadelphia
 Be Here Brewing Company, Avondale, founded in 2019
 Brewery ARS, Philadelphia
 Cartesian Brewing Company, Philadelphia
 Dock Street Brewing Company, Philadelphia, founded in 1985
 Evil Genius Beer Company, Philadelphia
 Iron Hill Brewery & Restaurant, multiple locations, brewpub, founded in 1996
 Lancaster Brewing Company, Lancaster, founded in 1995
 Love City Brewing Company, Philadelphia
 Neshaminy Creek Brewing Company, Croydon, founded in 2010
 Philadelphia Brewing Company, Philadelphia, founded in 2007
 Reading Brewing Company, Reading (revived the former trademark of, but is otherwise unrelated to, the original Reading Brewing Company, which closed in 1976)
Separatist Brewing Company, Philadelphia
 Sly Fox Brewing Company, Pottstown, brewpub
 Stoudt's Brewing Company, Adamstown, founded in 1987
 Tired Hands Brewing Company, Ardmore, brewpub
 Triple Bottom Brewing, New Hope, brewery, founded in 2019
 Triumph Brewing, New Hope, brewpub, founded in 2003
 Victory Brewing Company, Downingtown, brewpub, founded in 1996
 Weyerbacher Brewing Company, Easton, founded in 1995
 Yards Brewing Company, Philadelphia, founded in 1994

Central Pennsylvania
 Appalachian Brewing Company, Harrisburg, Gettysburg, Mechanicsburg, Collegeville, Lititz, formed in 1994
Axemann Brewery, Bellefonte, founded in 2020
Englewood Brewing, Hummelstown, founded in 2020
 Otto's Pub and Brewery, State College, founded in 2002
 Tröegs Brewing Company, Hershey, founded in 1996
 Yuengling (D. G. Yuengling & Son), Pottsville, established in 1829

Southwestern Pennsylvania
 The Church Brew Works, Pittsburgh, founded in 1996
 City Brewing Company, Latrobe; formerly Latrobe Brewing (the producers of Rolling Rock), now a contract brewer for national brands
 Duquesne Brewing Company, Pittsburgh, founded in 2011 (revived the former trademark of, but is otherwise unrelated to, the original Duquesne Brewing Company, which closed in 1972)
 East End Brewing Company, Pittsburgh, founded in 2003
 Fort Pitt Brewing Company, Pittsburgh, 1906-1957
 Hitchhiker Brewing Company, Pittsburgh, founded in 2014
 Iron City Brewing Company, Pittsburgh, founded in 1899 (formerly Pittsburgh Brewing Company)
 Lolev Beer, Pittsburgh, founded  in 2021
 Pennsylvania Brewing Company, Pittsburgh, formed in 1986

Northwestern Pennsylvania
The Brewerie at Union Station, Erie, founded in 2006
Straub Beer, St. Marys, founded in 1872
Erie Brewing Company, Erie, founded in 1994

Northeastern Pennsylvania
Lion Brewery, Inc., Wilkes-Barre, founded in 1909 (a.k.a. Gibbons Brewery 1943-1974)

Defunct breweries and brewpubs
 Joseph Potts Ale Brewery, founded 1774 in Philadelphia by Joseph Potts. Purchased 1786 by Henry Pepper, then George Pepper beginning in 1807, then David Pepper in 1836. Robert Smith purchased it in 1845 and the Robert Smith Ale Brewing Co remained open until closed by Prohibition in 1920. 
 John F. Betz & Sons, Philadelphia, founded in 1775 as the Robert Hare & J. Warren Peter Brewery, closed in 1939
 Point Brewery, Fort Pitt, founded by James O'Hara in 1803 on the site of a smaller, pre-existing brewery that had been in existence since at least 1795; closed in 1860
 Mount Carbon Brewery, Pottsville, founded in 1845 as George Lauer, closed in 1976
 Fuhrmann & Schmidt Brewing Company, Shamokin, began operations in 1854 as the Eagle Run Brewery, bought by H. Ortlieb Brewing Company in 1966, ceased operations in spring 1976
 Christian Schmidt Brewing Company, Philadelphia, founded as Robert Coutrennay Brewery in 1859, the Christian Schmidt & Sons Brewing Company was sold in 1987 to G. Heileman Brewing Company of La Crosse, Wisconsin
 Duquesne Brewing Company, Pittsburgh (1899–1972)
 Latrobe Brewing Company, Latrobe, founded in 1893, closed in 2006; Rolling Rock is now brewed by Anheuser-Busch in Newark, New Jersey
 Independent Brewing Company of Pittsburgh, Pittsburgh, founded in 1905 as a conglomerate of fifteen breweries; dissolved in 1933

See also 
 Beer in the United States
 List of breweries in the United States
 List of microbreweries

References

External links
Pennsylvania breweries directory at RateBeer.com
Information on Pennsylvania Craft Breweries, Micro Breweries, Nano Breweries, and Regional Breweries
List of breweries in Pennsylvania
Pizza Boy Opening their Secondary Location

Pennsylvania
Breweries